The 49th Golden Horse Awards (Mandarin:第49屆金馬獎) took place on November 24, 2012 at Luodong Cultural Factory in Yilan County, Taiwan.

References

49th
2012 film awards
2012 in Taiwan